Osmania College, Kurnool is a college in Kurnool. It was established in 1947 by philanthropist, Dr. M. Abdul Haq who approached the Nizam of Hyderabad - Mir Osman Ali Khan to raise funds for its establishment and the Nizam granted a capital of 2 Lakh INR at that time.

It is the first degree college in Kurnool in Rayalaseema and one of oldest in Andhra Pradesh state. It is a minority institution, recognized by UGC under Section 2(f) and 12(b) of the UGC Act of 1956. It has been affiliated to Rayalaseema University, Kurnool from 2010.

The college is on a campus of 9.5 acres. Osmania College has a large library with ancient moral paintings and some rare books.

Academics
Osmania College offers courses in Arts, Humanities, Social Sciences, Sciences, Commerce, Management and Computer Applications at the undergraduate level, besides M.A. (English Literature), M.Sc. (Physics), M.Sc. (Organic Chemistry) and M.Com. (Professional) at post-graduate level.

References

External links
 Osmania College, Kurnool, Official website
 Wikimapia

Colleges in Andhra Pradesh
Universities and colleges in Kurnool district
Kurnool
Educational institutions established in 1947
1947 establishments in India
Establishments in Hyderabad State
Academic institutions formerly affiliated with the University of Madras